Ocularia quadroalbovittipennis is a species of beetle in the family Cerambycidae. It was described by Stephan von Breuning in 1960.

References

Oculariini
Beetles described in 1960
Taxa named by Stephan von Breuning (entomologist)